Neonegeta pollusca is a moth of the family Nolidae first described by Schaus in 1893. It is found in Sierra Leone and Ghana.

References

Chloephorinae
Moths of Africa
Insects of West Africa
Moths described in 1893